The 2017 Liga 3 West Sumatra is the third edition of Liga 3 West Sumatra as a qualifying round for the 2017 Liga 3. 

The competition scheduled starts on July 15, 2017.

Teams
There are 14 clubs which will participate the league in this season.

References 

2017 in Indonesian football
Sport in West Sumatra